Silakhor may also refer to:
Silakhor-e Olya, a village
Silakhor-e Sofla, a village
Silakhor District
Silakhor Plain
Silakhor Rural District